Astronomical Society Ruđer Bošković is an astronomical society in Belgrade, Serbia. Founded in 1934 by a group of students, it is the oldest one in the Balkans. Initially having only several members, today it gathers more than 700 astronomy lovers. It is named after Ruđer Bošković.

The main role of the Society is popularisation of astronomy. The Society also practices amateur astronomy observations. To accomplish this, in 1964, the Society founded the Public Observatory, which is still located in adapted Despot's Tower in Kalemegdan, Belgrade. The Belgrade Planetarium, one of the only two planetariums in Serbia, is also founded by the society, in 1970. It is located in the lower part of Kalemegdan Fortress, in a former Turkish bath. The Society publishes a popular science magazine called Vasiona since 1953.

History

A group of students at the Belgrade University back at the 1934 decided to form an astronomical society focused on amateur observations and astronomy popularization. Before the World War II, the Society published magazine Saturn, organized popular lectures and few observation trips. Thanks to the Society's efforts, the translation of the book Stars and Atoms by sir Arthur Eddington was published. All activities in Society were banned by during the German occupation in 1941.

Society continued its work in 1953 as the Astronomical Society Ruđer Bošković and has begun to publish magazine Vasiona. Publication of books was also one of the Society's main activities: Ruđer Bošković's Eclipses of the Sun and the Moon (translated and commented by Nenad Janković) was published.

In 1964 Society has established the Public Observatory, located in the Despot's Tower in Kalemegdan. At the terrace of Observatory a Zeiss refracting telescope (110/200) is placed. The Society also got a planetarium ZKP-2 in 1970 and opened the Belgrade Planetarium with diameter of 8 m and 80 seats. Planetarium is mainly visited by the students of primary and high schools.

During the 60s, 70s and 80s amateur astronomical observations of the Sun, occultations, binary and variable stars and planetary phenomena were regular. Too much light pollution around the Observatory in the last 5–10 years has limited Society's activities mainly on theoretical works and application of computers in astronomy. Every year Society organizes a few courses for the popularization of astronomy, like: the Astronomy Course for beginners held two times annually, Belgrade Astronomy Weekend (BAW) in June which consists of several lectures on different topics and Summer Astronomical Gatherings in August and September with several lectures on similar topic. All courses are held in the Society's planetarium.

See also

 Astronomy in Serbia
 Popular Observatory
 Belgrade Planetarium
 Vasiona
 List of astronomical societies

References

External links
 Official website
 English main page

Astronomy in Serbia
Amateur astronomy organizations
Scientific organizations based in Serbia
1934 establishments in Yugoslavia